Kevin Turner may refer to:

B. Kevin Turner (born 1965), American businessman and former COO of Microsoft
Kevin Turner (running back) (1969–2016), American football running back
Kevin Turner (linebacker) (born 1958), American football player